Cervesina is a comune (municipality) in the Province of Pavia in the Italian region Lombardy, located about  south of Milan and about  southwest of Pavia.

Cervesina borders the following municipalities: Corana, Mezzana Rabattone, Pancarana, Voghera, Zinasco.

Demographic evolution

References

External links

 www.comune.cervesina.pv.it/

Cities and towns in Lombardy